Serpin A9 also known as centerin or GCET1 is a protein that in humans is encoded by the SERPINA9 gene located on chromosome 14q32.1. Serpin A9 is a member of the serpin family of serine protease inhibitors.

Function 

The expression of SERPINA9 is restricted to germinal center B cells and lymphoid malignancies. SERPINA9 is likely to function in vivo in the germinal center as an efficient inhibitor of trypsin-like proteases.

References

Further reading

External links 
 The MEROPS online database for peptidases and their inhibitors: I04.082
 

Serine protease inhibitors